The 2000 Pendle Borough Council election took place on 4 May 2000 to elect members of Pendle Borough Council in Lancashire, England. One third of the council was up for election and the council stayed under no overall control.

After the election, the composition of the council was:
Labour 24
Liberal Democrat 18
Conservative 9

Background
Before the election, the Liberal Democrats held 23 seats, compared to 19 for Labour and 8 Conservatives, while one seat was vacant. Seventeen seats were being contested, with two seats being up for election in Waterside ward after Labour councillor Ann Doult resigned from the council due to ill health. The Liberal Democrats only contested 13 of the 17 seats, saying "we're concentrating our resources where we think it's best".

Election result
The results saw no party win a majority on the council, but the Labour party gained 4 seats.

Ward results

By-elections between 2000 and 2002
A by-election in Horsfield ward took place on 1 March 2001 after Labour councillor Colin Nightingale resigned his seat on the council due to pressure of work. The Liberal Democrats gained the seat from Labour by 429 votes, with the former mayoress of Pendle, Dorothy Lord, regaining a seat on the council after she had lost her seat in Vivary Bridge at the 2000 election.

References

2000 English local elections
2000
2000s in Lancashire